The Council of Oxford is a historical council where Henry II of England grants Cork and Limerick to English barons, provides for the administration of Leinster and makes his son, John, Lord of Ireland. It was established in the 1170s and lasted until when the Oxford Parliament (1258) known as "Mad Parliament" ended it during the reign of Henry III of England.

References

1170s in England